Hydrocodone/aspirin (INNs) is an oral combination drug formulation of the opioid analgesic hydrocodone and the nonsteroidal anti-inflammatory drug (NSAID) aspirin that is used in the treatment of chronic and acute pain. It is sold under brand names including Alor 5/500, Azdone, Damason-P, Lortab ASA, and Panasal 5/500.

Adverse effects

See also
 Hydrocodone/paracetamol
 Hydrocodone/ibuprofen
 Oxycodone/aspirin

References

Combination analgesics